Luxford is a surname, and may refer to:

 Annabel Luxford (born 1982), Australian triathlete
 Frank Luxford (1862–1954), New Zealand cricketer
 George Luxford (1807–1854), English botanist
 Ian Luxford (born 1952), Australian rower
 John Luxford (1890–1971), New Zealand lawyer and Mayor of Auckland City
 Michael Luxford (born 1995), Australian rules footballer
 Nola Luxford (1901–1994), New Zealand film actor

See also
Luxford House, 16th-century Grade II listed building near Crowborough, East Sussex